Boomtown, Inc. was an American gaming company founded in 1988 and was based in Verdi, Nevada and was the headquarters of Boomtown Reno. It was acquired on July 1, 1997, by Hollywood Park, Inc. (now Pinnacle Entertainment) for $188 million.

The company agreed on January 19, 1995, to buy National Gaming for $500 million, to be partly financed by Hospitality Franchise Systems, which had spun off National months earlier. Boomtown cancelled the deal on April 4, 1995, because of shareholder objections.

List of properties
 Boomtown Biloxi — Biloxi, Mississippi
 Boomtown Las Vegas — Enterprise, Nevada
 Boomtown New Orleans — Harvey, Louisiana
 Boomtown Reno — Verdi, Nevada

References

1988 establishments in Nevada
1997 disestablishments in Nevada
Gambling companies established in 1988
Gambling companies disestablished in 1997
Companies based in Reno, Nevada
Defunct gambling companies
Gambling companies of the United States
Pinnacle Entertainment